O Ya is a Japanese restaurant in Boston and on the east side of Manhattan. The restaurant is owned by Tim and Nancy Cushman.

Description 
The menu has included sushi, sashimi, nigiri, and small plates.

The Boston location opened in 2007.

Reception 
In 2022, O Ya was named Best Japanese Restaurant in Boston magazine's Best of Boston list.

See also 

 List of Japanese restaurants
 List of restaurants in Boston

References

External links
 O Ya at Zomato

Japanese restaurants in the United States
Restaurants in Boston
Restaurants in Manhattan